Dato' Ramanan Ramakrishnan is a Malaysian politician who has served as the Member of Parliament (MP) for Sungai Buloh since November 2022.

Election results

References

Living people
21st-century Malaysian politicians
Members of the 15th Malaysian Parliament
People's Justice Party (Malaysia) politicians
Malaysian politicians of Indian descent
Year of birth missing (living people)